Austin Robert Carlile (born September 27, 1987) is an American musician and baseball coach from Pensacola, Florida. He achieved prominence as formerly the lead vocalist of Attack Attack! and Of Mice & Men. After leaving Of Mice & Men, he began coaching youth baseball in Costa Rica. A high school athlete, multiple surgeries from Marfan syndrome during his teenage years turned him towards music. In December 2016, Carlile departed from Of Mice & Men due to his Marfan syndrome and the effects that his vocal performances were having on his body.

Musical career

Attack Attack! (2006–2008)
Carlile formed Attack Attack! (originally called Ambiance) around 2006 when Johnny Franck, Andrew Whiting, Nick White, and Andrew Wetzel met Carlile while playing in local high school bands. In 2008, halfway through a tour supporting Maylene and the Sons of Disaster, Confide, A Static Lullaby, and Showbread. Carlile was replaced by Nick Barham, brother of former Sleeping with Sirens drummer Gabe Barham. Carlile said it was for "personal reasons" that he left the band, while the band released a separate statement.

Of Mice & Men (2009–2010, 2011–2016)

On October 8, 2009, the same day Carlile announced that he was no longer a part of Attack Attack!, he officially announced the formation of his new project, Of Mice & Men, with Jaxin Hall (bassist). Their first release was "Seven Thousand Miles for What?". They also did a cover of Lady Gaga's "Poker Face", then soon after released "No Really, It's Fine". Soon after, Austin and Jaxin started to gather up the other members of the band. The band recruited several members of already-existing bands, such as Phil Manansala (lead guitarist) from A Static Lullaby, and Valentino Arteaga (drummer) from Lower Definition. Their self-titled debut album was officially announced to be released on February 23, 2010, but was delayed until March 9 for finishes on production. In 2010, Austin was unable to tour with Of Mice & Men, because he needed to have major heart surgery, and his health prevented him from touring. Jerry Roush from Sky Eats Airplane served as the tour replacement for Austin. Roush then became a permanent substitute, even after Carlile was able to tour again.
In September 2010, shortly after the departure of Craig Owens of Chiodos, rumors that Carlile would replace him circulated quickly, but were denied when Brandon Bolmer was announced as vocalist. A fake tweet from Carlile's account was produced making it seem that Carlile would be joining Chiodos as vocalist. Carlile re-joined the band on January 3, 2011. In November 2012, after the death of Suicide Silence singer Mitch Lucker, Carlile appeared on Ending Is the Beginning: The Mitch Lucker Memorial Show singing the song "O.C.D.".

In the early morning of March 30, 2013, Carlile was arrested in Bowling Green, Ohio with drum technician Lionel Robinson II, he was later charged with felonious assault. The band missed two shows on the "Right Back at It Again" tour with A Day to Remember and Chunk! No, Captain Chunk! as a result. Carlile's mugshot was released two days later. Carlile was released on bail and ordered not to have any contact with the victim. On April 29, 2013, Carlile's original charge of felonious assault was reduced to misdemeanor assault by the judge, and he was subsequently found guilty. He was fined $1,000 plus court expenses, although $800 of the fine was suspended.

In October 2016, the band pulled out in the midst of a European tour so that Carlile could seek medical treatment after experiencing pain during a show in Portsmouth. In late November, Carlile elaborated in a series of tweets that, as a sufferer of Marfan syndrome, he wouldn't "get better" and that he had undergone multiple surgeries "just so I can function/live."

On December 30, 2016, Austin Carlile posted on his Instagram and Twitter an open letter stating that he's leaving the band to focus on healing, moving on, and getting better after settling in Costa Rica, saying "...with the closing of one door, another will open." He also said that he "will not stop playing music" and that he is "still able to sing and I'm hungry for what is next to come even though I have no idea what that may be."

It was revealed on February 17, 2017 that one of the other reasons Carlile had left the band was because he wasn't allowed to write what he wanted on the next record. In a reply to an Instagram comment about whether or not he would be working with Of Mice & Men in the future, he said "No I will no longer be writing with them, one of the reasons I left. They weren't going to let me write what I wanted on next record. That's not gonna happen. I will write what I want despite what that means giving up."

Personal life
On May 13, 2005, Carlile's mother died at the age of 38 due to an aneurysm. She also had undiagnosed Marfan syndrome, a disease Carlile would genetically inherit. Although raised Catholic, Carlile became disillusioned with the religion for a while in the wake of his mother's sudden death. However, on July 3, 2016, Carlile was baptized and identifies as Christian ever since. Allegedly, since his time in Costa Rica some visiting ministers prayed for him and the symptoms of his condition subsided where he could again live an active and healthy lifestyle. On June 21, 2019, he got engaged to his now wife, Marivel Gavaldon who has a daughter from a previous relationship named Lovelokai. Carlile resides in Guanacaste, Costa Rica. On January 15, 2021, Gavaldon gave birth to their daughter, Lilikoi.

Rape and sexual misconduct allegations
Carlile was accused of the alleged rape and sexual misconduct of multiple women from recent cases that are alleged to have occurred over several years. The cases had been submitted to the American music magazine Alternative Press. The magazine interviewed more than 10 suspected victims after multiple women made allegations against Carlile. The magazine constructed an investigative article on the cases to which they ultimately decided to not publish, which resulted in controversy. They explained on social media "For legal purposes regarding the Austin Carlile accusations, the story couldn't run as it was told. [...] We do not condone any of the accusations & this story WILL be heard."

On June 10, 2020, Alternative Press founder Mike Shea posted a statement explaining why the Carlile investigation was never published as expected. On June 18, Carlile denied the accusations made against him in a statement.

Discography

As lead singer
With Call It Even
Over and Done (EP) (self-released, 2006)

With Attack Attack!

If Guns Are Outlawed, Can We Use Swords? (EP) (self-released, 2008)
Someday Came Suddenly (Rise, 2008)

With Of Mice & Men

 Of Mice & Men (Rise, 2010)
 The Flood (Rise, 2011)
 Restoring Force (Rise, 2014)
 Cold World (Rise, 2016)

As featured artist
 2008 – "Time Won't Wait" (Fantastic!) on the album Go Whatever
 2009 – "Have You Ever Danced?" (Breathe Carolina) on the Deluxe Edition of the album Hello Fascination
 2009 – "Truth Be Told" (Her Demise, My Rise) on the album The Takeover
 2009 – "It's a Long Drive Home from Texas" (We Are Defiance)
 2009 – "Fighting Is for Dead Men" (Though She Wrote) on the album The Invitation
 2011 – "The New York Chainsaw Massacre" (That's Outrageous!) on the album Teenage Scream

References

1987 births
Musicians from San Jose, California
American heavy metal singers
Nu metal singers
Living people
People from Pensacola, Florida
People from Hollywood, Los Angeles
People with Marfan syndrome
Singers from Ohio
Singers from Florida
21st-century American singers
Singers from California
21st-century American male singers